Shalom in the Home was an American family-centered weekly hour-long prime time reality television series on TLC (The Learning Channel). It was hosted by Orthodox Rabbi Shmuley Boteach, on Mondays at 9 p.m. In the show, Boteach counseled dysfunctional families. The show ran  for two seasons, from April 2006 to March 2007. It was one of the cable network's highest-rated shows, and was the first reality TV show to have a rabbi as its star. National Fatherhood Initiative gave Boteach its most prestigious award for the series.

Show format
Shalom in the Home was an American family-centered hour-long reality television series on TLC (The Learning Channel). It was hosted by Orthodox Rabbi Shmuley Boteach for two seasons, on Mondays at 9 p.m. In the show, Boteach counseled dysfunctional families.

The show debuted on April 10, 2006. A second and final season of Shalom in the Home began on March 4, 2007.

The weekly one-hour prime-time program sought to help families overcome difficult problems. Boteach provides advice to dysfunctional families about relationships, marriage, and parenting, and tries to bring them peace (shalom, in Hebrew). In each episode he works with one family for ten days, playing the rule of family therapist, to help them come to terms with their problems, and find the skills they need to improve.

After Boteach drives up to and parks in front of each troubled family's home in an Airstream trailer equipped with television monitors (the "Shalom Mobile Home"), cameras are installed in the family's home—capturing footage of the family's dynamics.  Boteach later brings the parents into the trailer, which is "neutral territory", showed them the footage, and gently confronted them about the family's dysfunction in the hope of shocking them into change.  Other techniques he used included: having family members wear earpieces so that Boteach could encourage positive, healthy interactions, and discourage negative, dysfunctional behaviors; and taking the family on an outdoors outing or activity.

Among the families that he counsels are one with parents who divorced because of the father's infidelity who have four children who are fighting, a lesbian couple, a widow, and two previously divorced parents jointly raising children from their first marriages, and a Muslim family in which the parents’ busy lives drained romance from their relationship. While Boteach uses wisdom he has learned from Judaism, he does not refer to Judaism and the show is not about religion.

Boteach appeared with families from Shalom in the Home on The Oprah Winfrey Show, to discuss common family problems and how to solve them. He also followed the series with a book in 2007, by the same name. After the series ended, Boteach remained in contact with the families, counseling them, and having them over to his home.

Reception
Shalom in the Home attracted almost 700,000 viewers per episode, and was one of the cable network's highest-rated shows. It was the first reality TV show to have a rabbi as its star. Common Sense Media gave it a rating of four stars out of five. Boteach in 2007 received the most prestigious award of the National Fatherhood Initiative for the show.

Rabbi Irwin Kula of the National Jewish Center for Learning and Leadership, a Jewish think tank, said: "He’s trying to take an ancient tradition that has been familial, tribal, and inwardly focused, and translate it into an American idiom so it can benefit the larger society. He’s essentially bringing the Torah to the marketplace of ideas, and there are very few people doing this." The publication J. The Jewish News of Northern California wrote that unlike hosts in similar shows, Boteach: "really seems to care more about helping people than demeaning them."

References

External links

Shalom in the Home news article
Stacey Dresner (May 11, 2007). "Love is bottom line for 'Shalom in the Home'", Connecticut Jewish Ledger

2006 American television series debuts
2007 American television series endings
2000s American reality television series
English-language television shows
Television series about dysfunctional families
Television series about Jews and Judaism
TLC (TV network) original programming
Family in the United States